Kanchanadit is a district (amphoe) in Surat Thani province, south Thailand.

History
Originally, the town was named Tha Thong (ท่าทอง) after the river of the same name (Tha Thong Mai, (named Khlong Tha Phet at the time). During the reign of King Nangklao (Rama III), the town was moved because it was malaria-infested and renamed Kanchanadit. It was a provincial town (mueang) under the control of the Nakhon Si Thammarat Kingdom. After King Mongkut took power, it was put under the supervision of Bangkok directly. In 1899, the province was merged with Chaiya and reduced to amphoe (district) status.

Geography
The district is in the eastern part of the province. It stretches from the coast to Bandon Bay of the Gulf of Thailand in the north, the low river valley of the Tapi River to the west, and the Nakhon Si Thammarat mountain range in the south and west. Tai Rom Yen National Park was created on 31 December 1991, protecting the forested hills of that mountain range. The main river in the district is the Tha Thong River, which empties into the Tapi estuary.

Neighbouring districts are (from the east clockwise): Don Sak, Sichon, Nopphitam of Nakhon Si Thammarat, Ban Na San and Mueang Surat Thani.

The main road through the district is Thailand Route 401, which connects Kanchanadit with the town of Surat Thani. Thailand Route 44 begins at Route 401 and runs to the southwest as part of a land bridge across the Malay Peninsula.

Administration

Central

Kanchanadit district is divided into 13 sub-districts (tambons), which are further subdivided into 117 administrative villages (mubans).

Local
There are five sub-district municipalities (thesaban tambons) in the district:
 Kanchanadit consisting of sub-district Kadae.
 Tha Thong Mai consisting of parts of sub-district Tha Thong Mai.
 Chang Sai consisting of sub-district Chang Sai.
 Krut consisting of sub-district Krut.
 Chang Khwa consisting of sub-district Chang Khwa.

There are nine sub-district administrative organizations (SAO) in the district:
 Tha Thong Mai consisting of parts of sub-district Tha Thong Mai.
 Tha Thong consisting of sub-district Tha Thong.
 Thung Kong consisting of sub-district Thung Kong.
 Phlai Wat consisting of sub-district Phlai Wat.
 Pa Ron consisting of sub-district Pa Ron.
 Takhian Thong consisting of sub-district Takhian Thong.
 Tha U-thae consisting of sub-district Tha U-thae.
 Thung Rang consisting of sub-district Thung Rang.
 Khlong Sa consisting of sub-district Khlong Sa.

Notable people
Kroekrit Thaweekarn, footballer

References

External links
amphoe.com (Thai)

Districts of Surat Thani province